The 2020–21 Scottish Women's Football Championship was to be the inaugural season of the Scottish Women's Football Championship after its formation as the third tier of women's football in Scotland, after the originally planned Northern Hemisphere  Summer 2020 season was abandoned due to the coronavirus pandemic. 

Following delays in restarting the season in 2021, the SWFA decided on 29 April 2021 to declare the Championship season null and void after three fixtures, to focus on preparing for the 2021–22 season.

The league was to be split into two divisions - Championship North with 12 teams and Championship South with 14 teams.

Teams

Championship North

Source: 

Notes

Championship South

Source: 

Notes

Championship North

League table
The following shows the standings at the point the season was declared null and void on 29 April 2021.

Results

Championship South
The following shows the standings at the point the season was declared null and void on 29 April 2021.

League table

Results

SWPL play-offs
For the first time, a system of promotion/relegation play-offs was to be introduced to the SWPL. The two runners-up from Championship North and Championship South would have taken part in the play-off semi-finals with the winner playing the team finishing eighth in SWPL 2 in the final for the last place in the 2021–22 Scottish Women's Premier League.

References

External links
 Championship North at SWF
 Championship South at SWF

Scot
Scottish Women's Football Championship seasons
Championship